Cabletren Bolivariano is an automated people mover, built by Constructora Norberto Odebrecht and Doppelmayr Cable Car located in Caracas, Venezuela. The interval between successive vehicles is around 250 seconds. Public operation commenced in August 2013.
It can handle approximately 3,000 passengers per hour per direction.

References

Cable car railways in Venezuela
Rapid transit in Venezuela
Transport in Caracas
Caracas Metro
Railway lines opened in 2013
People movers